Joshua Stephen Wise (born January 31, 1986) is an American actor.  He is most notable for playing the character Pat Brody in The WB's 2002 television sitcom, Do Over.

Biography 

Josh Wise was born in Dallas, Texas and raised in McAllen, Texas. After showing promise in junior high school drama classes, his mother enrolled him in acting lessons. Subsequently, his acting coach introduced him to a manager. Soon he was cast in a starring role in the pilot for an unaired series on The WB called Murphy's Dozen. He also appeared in episodes of Frasier and Lizzie McGuire. In 2002, he relocated to Los Angeles after being cast as a series regular on Do Over.

Filmography

References

External links 
Official site

1986 births
American male child actors
American male film actors
American male television actors
Living people
Male actors from Dallas